Guamia is a monotypic genus of flowering plants in the soursop family, Annonaceae. The sole species it contains, Guamia mariannae, is endemic to the Marianas Islands.

References

External links

Monotypic magnoliid genera
Annonaceae genera
Flora of the Mariana Islands
Taxa named by William Edwin Safford